The Book of Dreams is a fantasy novel by O. R. Melling. It is the fourth and last book in the Chronicles of Faerie series. The first three books are The Hunter's Moon, The Summer King and The Light-Bearer's Daughter.

Plot 

The gateways between Faerie and the Earthworld have been destroyed by the Enemy. The only hope of ever bridging the two worlds again lies with Dana, a troubled teenager now living in Toronto. In a dream, Dana is told by her fairy mother, Edane, that the key to restoring the gateways is in The Book of Dreams. But quest she does, the length and breadth of the land, pursued by evil forces and aided by many new friends including Gwen and Laurel of the Companions of Faerie, and Jean, a classmate from Quebec with his own dark secret. Soon, Dana discovers that Canada is home to magic as frightening and wondrous as anything she left behind in Ireland.

References 

Canadian fantasy novels
2003 Canadian novels